Norman R.C. Campbell is a Professor Emeritus of the University of Calgary, where he served as professor of Medicine, Community Health Sciences and Physiology and Pharmacology and as a member of the O'Brien Institute for Public Health and Libin Cardiovascular Institute of Alberta.

Campbell held the HSFC CIHR Chair in Hypertension Prevention and Control (2011–2016) and served on the executive of the World Hypertension League as President. Currently, he is a Special Advisor to the League. He works to improve hypertension control, unhealthy diets and physical inactivity on a local, national and global scale. He is well known for his work with sodium reduction around the world. He has over 520 publications in peer-reviewed journals and has received several recognitions for his efforts.

Campbell obtained an MD degree from Memorial University of Newfoundland where he also completed his Internal Medicine residency. He has spoken at more than 450 conferences worldwide.

Recognitions and awards 

 1995 - Piafsky Young Investigator Award in 1995 from the Canadian Society for Clinical Pharmacology
 1996 - Distinguished Achievement Award for Education and Research from the University of Calgary Faculty of Medicine 
 2001 - Olser Award from the Canadian Society of Internal Medicine 
 2005 - Distinguished Service Award from the Canadian Society for Clinical Pharmacology
 2005 - Senior Investigator Award from the Canadian Society of Internal Medicine 
 2007 - Heart and Stroke Foundation of Canada Leadership Award in Heart Healthy Policy
 2009 - Canadian Hypertension Society Distinguished Service Award
 2013 - Guenter Award for International Health in the Canadian Society for Clinical Pharmacology
 2013 - JG Fodor award for prevention and control of hypertension from Hypertension Canada
 2014 - Appointed to the Order of Canada for his contributions as a researcher and public health advocate
 2014 - Appointed to the Fellowship in the Canadian Academy of Health Sciences
 2014 - Dr. Howard N. Segall Award of Merit, Canadian Cardiovascular Society
 2015 - Frederic Newton Gisborne Starr Award, the Canadian Medical Association’s highest honour for physicians 
 2015 - Medal for Distinguished Service from the Alberta Medical Association
 2015 - HRF Medal of Honour
 2015 - The University of Calgary named Dr Campbell a Peaks Scholar.
2019 - Memorial University of Newfoundland awarded Dr. Campbell the degree of Doctor of Science, honoris causa.

Expertise abroad 

 Dr. Campbell is a member of the Hong Kong International Advisory Panel on reduction of salt and sugar in food (2014–2018).
 He was an International Advisory Board member of the Iran salt reduction program, WHO Iranian office and Ministry of Health of Iran (2014).
 He was a member of the Ministry of Health of Iran International advisory member on hypertension control in 2013-2014.
 He was an external consultant to the Blood Pressure Programme for Public Health England in 2014. 
 His expertise has also taken him to India and Russia to discuss treatment and prevention of hypertension.

References 

Members of the Order of Canada
Academic staff of the University of Calgary
Memorial University of Newfoundland alumni
Canadian public health doctors